William Bond Ingpen Flynn (9 October 1951 – 23 April 2011) was an Australian politician. Born in Dorset, United Kingdom, he served as a British police officer for six years before he became an Australian citizen in 1984. He remained a policeman, serving in Brisbane, Beenleigh, Woodridge, Oxley and Beaudesert. In 2000, he was presented with a National Medal.

In 2001, Flynn was elected to the Legislative Assembly of Queensland as the member for Lockyer, representing Pauline Hanson's One Nation. He was elected leader of the parliamentary party in March 2001, shortly after the election. The resignation of Elisa Roberts from the party left Flynn with only one colleague, Rosa Lee Long. In the 2004 election, he defended his seat of Lockyer but lost it to National Party candidate Ian Rickuss, leaving Lee Long as One Nation's last MP. He unsuccessfully contested the seat of Oxley in the 2004 federal election.

Flynn died suddenly after a collapse on 23 April 2011.

References

1951 births
2011 deaths
One Nation members of the Parliament of Queensland
Politicians from Dorset
English emigrants to Australia
British police officers
Australian police officers
Members of the Queensland Legislative Assembly
21st-century Australian politicians